Nannophryne cophotis, or the Paramo toad, is a species of toad in the family Bufonidae that is endemic to northern Peru.
Its natural habitats are puna grassland, high-altitude plateaus, and dry scrubland; it also occurs agricultural land (e.g., potato and maize fields). It breeds in temporary small ponds and permanent shallow streams at altitudes of 2000-4100 meters asl. Individuals have not been recorded since 2005, after what was believed to be a severe decline in its population. It was last known from: Granja Porcón & El Empalme (1999-2000); La Libertad (2003); Ancash (2004); and Cajamarca (2005). If a population exists it is believed to have 0-49 individuals remaining threatened from loss of habitat, pollution, conversion of land for farming, small and large-scale mining concessions, and the modification of waterways.

References

cophotis
Amphibians described in 1900
Amphibians of the Andes
Amphibians of Peru
Endemic fauna of Peru
Páramo fauna
Taxonomy articles created by Polbot